In My Feelings is the debut EP by American drag queen and singer Aja, released on May 11, 2018. The EP features guest appearances by Mitch Ferrino, Wnnr, DJ Accident Report, and AVG JO.

Promotion
In My Feelings was supported by the lead single "Finish Her!" featuring Wnnr and DJ Accident Report, released on March 1, 2018. The EP's second single, "Brujería" featuring Mitch Ferrino, was released on May 7, 2018.

Track listing
Credits adapted from the iTunes Store. All songs written by Aja.

References

2018 debut EPs
Aja (entertainer) albums
EPs by American artists
Hip hop EPs